Elections to Wiltshire County Council were held on 6 May 1993.  The whole council was up for election and the result was no overall control, with the Liberal Democrats as the largest party. This resulted in a no-party-control shared administration for the first year of the Council, with the three main party groups being briefed on a coequal basis. Following a by-election gain by the Liberal Democrats from the Conservatives, giving the Liberal Democrats exactly half the seats on the Council,  a Liberal Democrat administration was formed, but with a convention that those chairing committees would not use their casting vote.

When Swindon Borough Council was established as a new unitary authority on 1 April 1997, the members who had been elected to the county council from Haydon Wick, Highworth, Stratton St Margaret, Swindon, Wanborough, and Wroughton ceased to hold office. The size of the council fell from 68 to 47, and in the  remaining month of the council's term of office the Liberal Democrats briefly gained control, but they lost it at the 1997 Wiltshire Council election, when there was a return to no overall control.

Results

|}

Results by divisions

Aldbourne and Ramsbury

Alderbury

Amesbury

Avon and Cannings

Bedwyn and Pewsey

Bourne Valley

Bradford on Avon

Bremhill and Calne

Calne

Chippenham Park

Chippenham Sheldon

Chippenham Town

Collingbourne

Corsham

Cricklade and Purton

Devizes

Devizes South and Bromham

Downton

Durrington

Haydon Wick

Highworth

Holt

Kington

Lavington

Malmesbury

Marlborough

Melksham

Melksham Without

Mere

Minety

Pickwick with Box

Salisbury Bemerton

Salisbury Harnham

Salisbury St Mark

Salisbury St Martin

Salisbury St Paul

Southwick

Stratton St Margaret, Coleview and Nythe

Stratton St Margaret, St Margaret

Stratton St Margaret, St Philip

Swindon Central

Swindon Covingham

Swindon Dorcan South

Swindon Eastcott

Swindon Freshbrook

Swindon Gorse Hill

Swindon Lawns

Swindon Moredon

Swindon Parks

Swindon Roughmoor

Swindon Toothill

Swindon Walcot

Swindon Western

Swindon Whitworth

Tisbury

Trowbridge East

Trowbridge South

Trowbridge West

Upper Wylye Valley

Wanborough

Warminster East

Warminster West

Westbury

Whorwellsdown

Wilton and Wylye

Wootton Bassett North

Wootton Bassett South

Wroughton

References

Wiltshire County Council Diary 1993/4 (Trowbridge: Wiltshire County Council, 1993)

External links
Colin Rallings, Michael Thrasher, Wiltshire County Council election Results 1973–2005 at electionscentre.co.uk

1993
1993 English local elections
1990s in Wiltshire